Salvatnet is a lake in the municipalities of Namsos and Nærøysund in Trøndelag county, Norway.

Salvatnet is a meromictic lake, meaning that the water is permanently stratified, often without oxygen in the lower depths (bottom water) due to density gradient and a lack of turnover. A meromictic lake often preserves records of the geologic past. The lower layer of the lake is highly saline and as a result denser than the higher levels of water. Other meromictic lakes in Norway with old seawater in the lower depths include Kilevann, Tronstadvann, Botnvatnet, Rørhopvatnet, and Rørholtfjorden.

See also
List of lakes in Norway

References

Namsos
Nærøysund
Lakes of Trøndelag
Meromictic lakes